Heze Caozhou Football Club is a Chinese football club based in Heze, Shandong, currently plays in Chinese Football Association Member Association Champions League.

Heze Caozhou gained entry to 2020 China League Two but withdrew before the start of the season.

Current squad
As of 12 March 2019

References

Football clubs in China